David Walton may refer to:
 David Walton (economist) (1963–2006), British economist
 Dave Walton (born 1973), English footballer
 David Walton (writer), U.S. writer and critic
 David Walton (science fiction writer) (born 1975), U.S. science fiction and fantasy novelist
 David Walton (actor) (born 1978), played Dr. Rick in Fired Up
 David Walton (ecologist) (1945–2019), British emeritus professor with the British Antarctic Survey